The ESL Pro League Season 14, abbreviated as EPL Season 14 and EPL XIV, was the fourteenth season of the ESL organized Counter-Strike: Global Offensive league, the ESL Pro League. Held between August 16 and September 12, 2021, as an online tournament, due to the COVID-19 pandemic. Part of the ESL Pro Tour, the season's twenty-four teams competed for a  prize pool and for 7,400 ESL Pro Tour Points (EPT), used by ESL to determine the participants of its two main events each year, in Katowice and Cologne.

Russian team Natus Vincere won the league for the first time, by beating French team Vitality 3–2 in the final. For the win Natus Vincere, received  of the prize pool and an additional , by becoming the third team to complete the Intel Grand Slam. Furthermore, Navi received 1,300 EPT, with Vitality receiving 1,000. Navi's Aleksandr "s1mple" Kostyliev was named the MVP.

Background and format

The ESL Pro League is a Counter-Strike: Global Offensive league, organized by German esports company ESL. Season 13 concluded on April 11, 2021, with Danish team Heroic beating Russian team Gambit 2–3. The qualification period started immediately after, with initial plans for the season to be played on-sight in Malta, ESL announced on July 20, that all matches would be played online from Europe.

Initially planned to be a LAN-tournament, with the matches being played in Malta, the season was like the previous three seasons played online, due to the COVID-19 pandemic.
The group stage of the season used the round-robin format; all teams in a group had to play once against each other in best-of-three matches. Each win gave a team three, each loss zero points. On July 27, ESL announced that the format of the tournament would change, removing the two play-off matches between the group's winner. Instead, the group's best-performing team would immediately advance to the quarterfinals, with the each group's second and third to play another match, to get the four last quarter finalist. According to ESL, the system was changed due to "feedback gathered from the community and in agreement with the teams and players".

Map pool
 Dust 2
 Mirage
 Inferno
 Overpass
 Nuke
 Vertigo
 Ancient

Teams competing
Like the previous season, 24 teams competed in the tournament. Twelve of those are permanent partners of ESL, therefore being invited directly to the season. Seven more teams were chosen by ESL, based on their positions on the companys CS:GO World Ranking. The five final teams qualified through tournaments held by ESL's partner, ESEA. Renegades qualified for the season in a one-of Oceania plaoff against the team Order, winning 3–1 on June 29. However, on August 11, Renegades announced that they would not participate, citing travel restrictions due to the ongoing pandemic. Joshua "INS" Potter said in a video released via Twitter that "Unfortunately, due to the global pandemic right now, we will be unable to attend ESL Pro League". ESL replaced Renegades with the Russian team forZe. Bad News Bear and TeamOne qualified via winning the ESEA Premier Season 36 and 37 North America, respectively. Sinners qualified on June 27, winning the 37th Season of ESEA Premier, scoring 2–0 against Polish team AGO, making Sinners the first Czech team to play in the EPL. 

Permanent partners
  Astralis
  Complexity Gaming
  ENCE
  Evil Geniuses
  Faze
  Fnatic
  G2 Esports
  mousesports
  Ninjas in Pyjamas
  Natus Vincere
  Team Liquid
  Vitality

Invited
  Gambit Esports
  Heroic
  Virtus.pro
  BIG
  Furia
  Team Spirit
  OG
  forZe 

Qualified
  Bad News Bears
  Renegades 
  Entropiq
  TeamOne
  Sinners

Broadcast talent

Desk hosts
  Tres "stunna" Saranthus
  Jason "jKaplan" Kaplan
Analysts
  Janko "YNk" Paunović
  Jason "moses" O'Toole
  Mathieu "Maniac" Quiquerez
Sideline Reporters
  Frankie "Frankie" Ward
  Matthew "Sadokist" Trivett

Commentators
  Chad "Spunj" Burchill
  Alex "Machine" Richardson
  Harry "JustHarry" Russell
  Hugo Byron
  Jamie "TheEternalJay" Martin
  Jack "wolfy6678" Saunders
  George "Bofferz" Bray
  Daniel "DanChan" Challinor
  Joshua "Dweg" Nathan
  Dean "Dean" Brown

Observers
  Michael "MC" Campagna
  Alexander "Rushly" Rush
  Jake "Jak3y" Elton
  Ryan "ItsRandall" Randall

Group stage
The group stage was divided into four groups each with six teams. Based on the tournament format, each team had to play five best-of-three matches. A win would be awarded with three points, a loss with zero. The group's best performing team would immediately advance to the quarterfinals, the second and third place had to play another best-of-three match in the round of twelve. Heroic and OG both won their group's without a single loss.

Group A

Group B

Group C

Group D

Playoffs

Bracket

Round of 12

Quarterfinals

Semifinals

Final

Post-season
For winning the tournament, Natus Vincere received  of the  prize pool (26%) and a spot in the BLAST Premier World Final 2021, which will be held in December 2021. With the win, Navi became the third team to complete the Intel Grand Slam, a special Intel sponsored competition, awarding  to the first team to either win "six ESL Pro Tour Masters tournaments inside a span of ten consecutive events" or winning "four ESL Pro Tour Masters tournaments inside a span of ten consecutive events, inclusive of a Championship level". Navi's run started with winning IEM Katowice 2020 in February 2020, the DreamHack Masters Spring 2021 in April, IEM Cologne 2021 and finally EPL Season 14. Furthermore, the team received 1300 Pro Tour Points, which are used by ESL to determine the participants of its two main events each year—Katowice and Cologne. The team accumulated 4137,50 Points by September 12, 2021. Navi's Aleksandr "s1mple" Kostyliev was named the seasons Most valuable player (MVP), giving him his third MVP in a row and the 16th of his career.

French runner-ups Vitality received  (10,7 %) of the prize pool and 1,000 Pro Tour Points. By September 12, Vitality accumulated 2162,50 points, placing them seventh on the leaderboard. Mathieu "ZywOo" Herbaut was the second best-performing player of the tournament, with the a 1.31 rating. Heroic and OG each received  and 780 PTP. According to eSports Charts the season's final was watched by more than 750,000 viewers with an average viewership of around 130,000 per match.

Final standings

References

2021 in esports
ESL Pro League